Noaea is a genus of flowering plants belonging to the family Amaranthaceae. It is in the Salsoloideae subfamily.

Its native range is from the southern and eastern Mediterranean to Pakistan. It is found in Afghanistan, Algeria, Crete, Cyprus, East Aegean Islands, Egypt (including Sinai Peninsula,), Greece, Iran, Iraq, Lebanon,  Libya, Morocco, North Caucasus region, Pakistan, Palestine, Saudi Arabia, Syria,  Transcaucasus region (Armenia, Georgia and Azerbaijan), Turkey, Turkmenistan and Uzbekistan.

The genus name of Noaea is in honour of François Thomas "Frank", Marquis De Noé (1806–1887), a French author on North African Lamiaceae. 
It was first described and published in A.P.de Candolle, Prodr. Vol.13 (Issue 2) on page 207 in 1849.

Known species
According to Kew:
Noaea cadmea 
Noaea kurdica 
Noaea major 
Noaea minuta 
Noaea mucronata 
Noaea tournefortii

References

Amaranthaceae
Amaranthaceae genera
Plants described in 1849
Flora of Crete
Flora of Greece
Flora of North Africa
Flora of Central Asia
Flora of the Caucasus
Flora of Western Asia